Madsen Airport may refer to:

 Tom Madsen Airport, also known as Unalaska Airport, a public airport in Unalaska, Alaska, United States (FAA: DUT)
 Madsen Airport (Wyoming), a private airport in Gillette, Wyoming, United States (FAA: WY65)